The Church of St Mary the Virgin, Iffley is a Church of England parish church in the village of Iffley, Oxfordshire, England, now absorbed as a suburb of the city of Oxford.

History

The Romanesque church was built c.1160 by the St Remy family, probably financed with funds from the de Clintons of Kenilworth Castle. The Early Gothic east end was extended in c.1230, when a cell was constructed on the south side for the anchoress Annora.

The building has not been changed much over the centuries, retaining its round-arched windows and doorways. It is Grade I listed.  The church includes a stained glass window by the 20th-century artist John Piper and another by Roger Wagner.

See also
 List of churches in Oxford

References

Further reading

External links

 St Mary's Iffley website

12th-century church buildings in England
12th-century establishments in England
Church of England church buildings in Oxford
Grade I listed buildings in Oxford
Grade I listed churches in Oxfordshire
English churches with Norman architecture